Miles Myers (1931–2015) was the leader of the Bay Area Writing Project and former Executive Director of the National Council of Teachers of English (NCTE), and director of the National Writing Project (NWP) in its early years.

Early years 
Myers was born in Newton, Kansas in 1931. In the 1940s he moved with his family to Pomona, California, and graduated from Pomona High School in 1949. During the Korean War Myers served in Germany.

Education 
Myers earned a bachelor's degree, two master's degrees and a PhD from the University of California, Berkeley.

Career 
He began writing at a young age. In high school he was an editor of the school newspaper and published stories about his personal travels in the Pomona Progress Bulletin. He taught English in the Oakland Public School system for 17 years, beginning at Washington Union High School in Fremont, California. He was a co-founder of the Bay Area Writing Project. He spent seven years as the Executive Director of the National Council of Teachers of English. He was the Chairman of the Curriculum Study Commission of Northern California, and worked as a consultant for the Institute for Research on Teaching and Learning.

Boards and commissions 
He served for 40 years as the Chairman of the Board of Alpha Plus Corporation; 30 years on the CCCTE's Curriculum Study Commission. He was Chair of the Research Foundation of the NCTE and served five years on the Board of the BASRC (Bay Area School Reform School in Fremont, California.

Personal life and death 
Myers died at the age of 84 on December 15, 2015 from complications of heart disease. He was married to Celeste for 59 years, and had three children, Royce, Brant and Roz. He had three sisters, Jean McClard, Joan Hope Cecil and Patty Gatlin Dennis.

References 

1931 births
2015 deaths